The House Intelligence Subcommittee on Terrorism/HUMINT, Analysis and Counterintelligence is one of the four subcommittees within the Permanent Select Committee on Intelligence

Members, 110th Congress

External links 
 Intelligence Committee Website

Intelligence Terrorism/HUMINT, Analysis and Counterintelligence